The Tornado outbreak of November 23–24, 2001 was a fall tornado outbreak which affected portions of the southern United States from Arkansas to Alabama on November 23–24, 2001, with additional tornadoes recorded in Louisiana, Kentucky, Missouri, Indiana and Georgia. Recorded as one of the most intense November outbreaks ever across that area, tornadoes from the event killed at least 13 across three states including 4 in Alabama, four in Arkansas and five in Mississippi.

Meteorological synopsis

A low-pressure system was situated, just after 5 AM on November 24, near Kansas City, Missouri. Its associated cold front traversed much of the outbreak-affected area with several supercells forming ahead of the front.  Rich moist air from the Gulf of Mexico and cold air aloft and wind shear provided the ingredients from a significant severe weather outbreak.

Supercells formed late across much of Arkansas and Mississippi during the evening hours of November 23 up into the early morning hours of November 24 produced several tornadoes including two F4 Mississippi tornadoes across Washington and Bolivar Counties at around 2 AM and in Madison County near the city of Madison at around 5 AM. The second tornado killed at least 2 (including a newborn baby) and injured 21. Another tornado in Mississippi, an F2, struck Quitman, Panola and Tate Counties just after 3 AM and killed at least three. In Arkansas, four people were killed by two separate tornadoes including three in Ashley County from a single tornado that moved from Louisiana.

Activity shifted into Alabama during midday on November 24 where numerous supercells traveled across the Birmingham coverage area. There were at least, according to the National Weather Service in Birmingham, 13 supercells that produced tornadoes including an F4 tornado that traversed Blount and Etowah Counties just after 1:00 PM. Activity ceased just after midnight with the final tornadoes touching down across Alabama in Dale County. In Alabama alone, 4 people were killed by two separate tornadoes including 2 from an F3 that moved from Pickens County northeastward and north of Birmingham and Tuscaloosa towards Walker County. Another tornado killed 2 in Cherokee County in the northeastern part of the state.

Confirmed tornadoes

November 23 event

November 24 event

See also

List of North American tornadoes and tornado outbreaks
Tornadoes of 2001

References

External links
 NWS Birmingham Tornado Outbreak page
 NWS Jackson, Mississippi, Tornado Outbreak page
 November 2001 Arkansas Severe Weather

F4 tornadoes by date
 ,2001-11-23
Tornadoes of 2001
Tornadoes in Alabama
Tornadoes in Arkansas
Tornadoes in Louisiana
Tornadoes in Mississippi
2001 natural disasters in the United States
November 2001 events in the United States